The Laughing Lady is a 1946 British Technicolor musical drama film directed by Paul L. Stein and starring Anne Ziegler, Webster Booth and Francis L. Sullivan. Based on a play by Ingram D'Abbes, its plot follows a young aristocrat who makes a deal with Robespierre during the French Revolution.

Plot summary
During the French Revolution, a young aristocrat makes a deal with Robespierre that he will locate and steal some pearls from Britain in order to save his mother from the guillotine.

Partial cast

References

External links

1946 films
1940s historical musical films
British historical musical films
1940s musical drama films
Films directed by Paul L. Stein
British musical drama films
Films set in England
Films set in the 18th century
British black-and-white films
Films with screenplays by Jack Whittingham
French Revolution films
1946 drama films
Films shot at British National Studios
1940s English-language films
1940s British films